Albert Bartel Hermann (March 28, 1899 – August 20, 1980) was a Major League Baseball infielder. He played two seasons with the Boston Braves from 1923 to 1924.

His daughter was U.S. House of Representative Jo Ann Emerson.

References

External links

1899 births
1980 deaths
Albany Senators players
Allentown Dukes players
Baltimore Orioles (IL) players
Baseball players from New Jersey
Boston Braves players
Bridgeport Bears (baseball) players
Elmira Colonels players
Hartford Senators players
Major League Baseball second basemen
Major League Baseball first basemen
Major League Baseball third basemen
New Haven Profs players
People from Lewes, Delaware
People from Milltown, New Jersey
Sportspeople from Middlesex County, New Jersey
Wichita Falls Spudders players
Worcester Panthers players